The Centre for Education in Mathematics and Computing (CEMC) is a Canadian educational organization dedicated to promoting and creating activities and materials in mathematics and computer science. Founded in 1995 with origins dating back to the 1960s, it is housed within the Faculty of Mathematics at the University of Waterloo. It runs off of funding from the University of Waterloo, Deloitte, the Bill and Melinda Gates Foundation, and other individual donors. Its mission is to increase interest, enjoyment, confidence, and ability in mathematics and computer science among learners and educators.

The CEMC administers the Canadian Mathematics Competitions (CMC), written annually by over 200,000 students from around the world, as well as contests in computer science. These competitions can be viewed as analogous to the structure of the American Regions Mathematics League. Attaining a score high enough to be on the Student Honour Roll associated with the contests is one of the most highly-viewed STEM achievements for Canadian secondary school students. 

The CEMC also holds other activities promoting mathematics in high school, such as math circles and teacher education programs.

Contests held 
The contests are listed by grade below.

 Grade 7 - Gauss 7
 Grade 8 - Gauss 8
 Grade 9 - Pascal and Fryer
 Grade 10 - Cayley and Galois
 Grade 11 - Fermat and Hypatia
 Grade 12 - Euclid
 Grade 9 and 10 - Canadian Intermediate Mathematics Contest
 Grade 11 and 12 - Canadian Senior Mathematics Contest
 All grades - Canadian Computing Competition (CCC)
 All grades, by invite only - Canadian Computing Olympiad (CCO)
 Grade 7/8 - 10 - the Beaver (Bebras) Computing Challenge for Grade 7/8 - 10 students. (Beaver)

Gauss 
The Gauss 7 and 8 contests (named after Carl Friedrich Gauss) are multiple-choice contests intended for grade 7 and 8 students respectively. Calculators without Internet connectivity, graphing, computer algebra systems or dynamic geometry software are allowed.

The Gauss 7 is offered to all grade 7 students as well as being offered to interested students in lower grades. Test includes material generally covered in the Ontario 7th grade curriculum, it focuses largely on geometry, number sense, and mathematical thinking. Generally written by approximately 45000 students all over Canada, most from Ontario. The mean sore on the test is 90/150 with around 500-600 students scoring in the 136-150 range.

The Gauss 8 contest is offered to all grade 8 students as well as being offered to interested students in lower grades. Test includes mostly the same material as the Gauss 7 with more emphasis on some algebra that is apart of the grade 8 curriculum. Generally written by approximately 45000 students all over Canada, most from Ontario. The mean score on the test is 90/150.

Questions are divided into 10 Part A questions, 10 Part B questions, and 5 Part C questions (worth 5/6/8 points respectively per question), ranging from easiest to hardest. Students are given 60 minutes to complete the questions. Starting in 2022, Part C questions are no longer multiple-choice and their answers are integers from 0 to 99, inclusive.

Pascal/Cayley/Fermat 
PCF (Pascal/Cayley/Fermat, each named after Blaise Pascal, Arthur Cayley and Pierre de Fermat respectively) are the multiple-choice contests that are offered to secondary school students. The maximum grade a student may be in to participate in the contests is 9/10/11 respectively. Each test covers material that is standard for each particular grade, and may be taken by students in lower grades. The maximum score is 150 with an average score of around 100 for each contest. Awards are given to some of the top scorers. Calculators without Internet connectivity, graphing, computer algebra systems or dynamic geometry software are allowed.

Questions are divided into 10 Part A questions, 10 Part B questions, and 5 Part C questions (worth 5/6/8 points respectively per question), ranging from easiest to hardest. Students are given 60 minutes to complete the questions. Starting in 2022, Part C questions are no longer multiple-choice and their answers are integers from 0 to 99, inclusive.

Fryer/Galois/Hypatia 
FGH (Fryer/Galois/Hypatia, named after Ken Fryer, a former professor at the University of Waterloo Faculty of Mathematics, Évariste Galois, and Hypatia of Alexandria respectively) are contests for grade 9/10/11 students respectively, but may be taken by students in lower grades. The maximum score is 40. Awards are given to some of the top scorers. Calculators without Internet connectivity, graphing, computer algebra systems or dynamic geometry software are allowed.

The contest consists of four written questions each worth 10 points, some of which require only an answer and others requiring full solutions, ranging from easiest to hardest. Students are given 75 minutes to complete the questions.

Euclid 
The Euclid contest (named after Euclid of Alexandria) is a contest for grade 12 students, but may be taken by students in lower grades. The maximum score is 100. Awards are given to some of the top scorers, and those who perform well are considered for scholarships. The University of Waterloo states: "We strongly encourage you to participate in the Euclid Mathematics Contest and/or the Canadian Senior Mathematics Contest if you’re applying to a program in the Faculty of Mathematics." Calculators without Internet connectivity, graphing, computer algebra systems or dynamic geometry software are allowed. 

The contest consists of 10 written questions each worth 10 points, some of which require only an answer and others requiring full solutions. Students are given 150 minutes to complete the questions. Questions ascend in difficulty as the participant progresses through the contest, with question 1 being very easy to question 10 being very difficult.

Some of the tested material consists of:
 Algebra and functions
 Geometry and analytic geometry
 Trigonometry
 Sequences and series
 Logarithms
 Probability and combinatorics
 Discrete mathematics

CIMC and CSMC 
The Canadian Intermediate Mathematics Competition (CIMC; for grades 9 and 10) and Canadian Senior Mathematics Competition (CSMC; for grades 11 and 12) are two contests both consisting of 6 questions (Part A) requiring only an answer and 3 questions (Part B) requiring full solutions. The maximum score is 60. Students are given 120 minutes to complete the questions. Awards are given to some of the top scorers, and those who perform well on the CSMC are considered for scholarships. Calculators without Internet connectivity, graphing, computer algebra systems or dynamic geometry software are allowed. 

The content of the CIMC covers up to the grade 10 curriculum, while the content of the CSMC covers all of the standard Canadian maths curricula.

CCC 
The Canadian Computing Competition (CCC) is a programming competition, split into Junior (for elementary programming skills) and Senior (for higher programming skills). There are 5 questions each worth 15 points, for a maximum score is 75, ranging from easy questions to difficult. Students are given 180 minutes to complete the questions. Knowledge of programming is tested, with the more difficult content being advanced algorithm design and mathematical reasoning. All written programs have a 3 second time limit and a maximum of 512 MB of memory. While access to the Internet is allowed (for accessing documentation), the use of other material (such as Google, chat systems, forums, and any other form of communication) is forbidden. Calculators are permitted. 

The CCC Online Grader accepts the following programming languages:
 C
 C++
 Python (2.x and 3.x)
 Pascal
 Java
 Perl
 PHP

For the Junior competition, the questions test the following content:
 Questions 1 and 2: basic loops and conditions
 Questions 3 and 4: combination of loops, conditions, counting
 Question 5: recursion, two-dimensional arrays, algorithm design

For the Senior competition, the questions test the following content:
 Questions 1 and 2: basic algorithm design (sorting and searching)
 Questions 3 and 4: advanced algorithm design (counting skills and mathematical reasoning)
 Question 5: International Olympiad for Informatics (IOI) level question

Students who perform well are considered for scholarships and are given rewards. The top 20 or so participants are invited to write the Canadian Computing Olympiad (CCO) at the University of Waterloo. It is used to select members for the Canadian delegation at the International Olympiad for Informatics (IOI).

See also
 University of Waterloo

References 

Computer science departments in Canada
University of Waterloo
1995 establishments in Ontario